Chojnowo may refer to the following places:
Chojnowo, Maków County in Masovian Voivodeship (east-central Poland)
Chojnowo, Grajewo County in Podlaskie Voivodeship (north-east Poland)
Chojnowo, Mońki County in Podlaskie Voivodeship (north-east Poland)
Chojnowo, Przasnysz County in Masovian Voivodeship (east-central Poland)
Chojnowo, Żuromin County in Masovian Voivodeship (east-central Poland)
Chojnowo, Lubusz Voivodeship (west Poland)
Chojnowo, Warmian-Masurian Voivodeship (north Poland)